In the Hebrew Bible, Amraphel  was a king of Shinar (Hebrew for Sumer) in Book of Genesis Chapter 14, who invaded Canaan along with other kings under the leadership of Chedorlaomer, king of Elam. Chedorlaomer's coalition defeated Sodom and the other cities in the Battle of the Vale of Siddim.

Modern identifications

Beginning with E. Schrader in 1888, Amraphel is usually associated with Hammurabi, who ruled Babylonia from 1792 BC until his death in 1750 BC. This view has been largely abandoned in recent years. Other scholars have identified Amraphel with Aralius, one of the names on the later Babylonian king-lists, attributed first to Ctesias. Recently, David Rohl argued for an identification with Amar-Sin, the third ruler of the Ur III dynasty. John Van Seters, in Abraham in History and Tradition, rejected the historical existence of Amraphel.

In Rabbinic tradition 

Rabbinic sources such as Midrash Tanhuma Lekh Lekhah 6, Targum Yonatan to Exodus 14:1, and Eruvin 53a identify Amraphel with Nimrod. This is also asserted in the 11th chapter of the Sefer haYashar, attested from the early 17th century:

Genesis Rabbah 42 says Amraphel was called by three names: Cush, after his father's name (Gen. 10:8), Nimrod, because he established rebellion (mrd) in the world, and Amraphel, as he declared (amar) "I will cast down" (apilah).

References

Bibliography
 Irving L. Finkel, The Ark Before Noah: Decoding the Story of the Flood (Knopf Doubleday Publishing Group, 2014).

External links
 Jewish Encyclopedia: Amraphel

Lech-Lecha
Nimrod
Sumerian kings
Torah monarchs
Hammurabi